Colin Fassnidge is an Irish-Australian chef, author and television presenter. Fassnidge has appeared as a judge on My Kitchen Rules since 2013 and hosted Kitchen Nightmares Australia in 2022.

Career

Fassnidge previously operated the restaurants Four in Hand and 4Fourteen. He now owns Banksia. Fassnidge also operates The Castlereagh by Fassnidge bistro at City Tattersalls Club. 

Fassnidge served as a judge on the Australian cooking show My Kitchen Rules alongside Manu Feildel and Pete Evans from 2013 to 2021, and appeared as a guest judge for the twelfth season in 2022.

In 2014, Fassnidge released his first cookbook, Four Kitchens. His second cookbook, The Commonsense Cook, was released in 2020.

In January 2021, Fassnidge appeared as a contestant on the seventh season I’m A Celebrity…Get Me Out Of Here! Australia. He was the tenth contestant to be eliminated, and placed fifth.

In March 2022, it was announced that Fassnidge is to host a new cooking show Kitchen Nightmares on Channel 7.

Personal life

Fassnidge married Jane Hyland in 2006 after they met while working at the same restaurant. They have two daughters and live in Sydney.

Television appearances

 My Kitchen Rules (2013–present)
 I’m A Celebrity…Get Me Out Of Here! (2021)
 Kitchen Nightmares (2022)

References

Living people
Australian television chefs
Cookbook writers
Irish emigrants to Australia
I'm a Celebrity...Get Me Out of Here! (Australian TV series) participants
Year of birth missing (living people)
People from Dublin (city)